Football in Malaysia was rocked by a bribery and corruption scandal in 1994.

At that time, more than 100 players and coaches suspected of fixing the results of Malaysia Cup and Premier League matches were detained by the authorities for interrogation. As a result, 58 of them were banned for one to four years by the Football Association of Malaysia (FAM). A total of 21 players and coaches were fired while several players were banned for life and not allowed to participate in FAM-organised competitions. Many Malaysian fans blamed the scandal in 1994 as a catalyst for the downfall of Malaysian football.

In 2016, 22 years after the scandal, a ban on 84 players was lifted by the FAM.

References 

Malaysia, 1994
Association football controversies
Scandal
Scandal
Scandals in Malaysia
Corruption in Malaysia